Mehmed "Memi" Bečirovič (born 1 March 1961) is a Slovenian professional basketball coach. He currently serves as the head coach for the Nanjing Monkey Kings of the Chinese Basketball Association (CBA). He was the head coach of the Slovenia national team from December 2009 till December 2010, when he was replaced by Božidar Maljković. He coached the national team at the 2010 FIBA World Championship in Turkey. He coached for ten teams in Slovenia, Italy, Ukraine, and Belgium in his thirteen-year career. This position was his first at the head of a senior international team, after previously coaching the Slovenian junior team at various age levels between 1997 and 2003.

Bečirovič's son, Sani, was a professional basketball player and now is sporting director, currently with Cedevita Olimpija.

As the head coach of the Iran national team, Bečirovič led the team to its first and second FIBA Asia Cup championship in the fourth and fifth edition of the tournament in Tokyo and Wuhan in 2012 and 2014. He also led Iran to their third title in 2013 FIBA Asia Championship and also qualification to the 2014 FIBA Basketball World Cup in Spain. He also led Iran to the silver medal at the 2014 Asian Games.

References

1961 births
Living people
Slovenian expatriate basketball people in Iran
Slovenian people of Bosnia and Herzegovina descent
Slovenian basketball coaches
Slovenia national basketball team coaches
Basket Rimini Crabs coaches
KK Olimpija coaches
KK Helios Domžale coaches
Slovenian expatriate basketball people in Italy
Slovenian expatriate sportspeople in Ukraine
Expatriate basketball people in Ukraine
Slovenian expatriate basketball people in Belgium
Slovenian expatriate sportspeople in China
Expatriate basketball people in China
Yugoslav basketball coaches
Basketball coaches of international teams